Howard Keith Clark (born 26 August 1954) is an English professional golfer who played on the European Tour for many years and had his most successful period in the mid-1980s.

Early life and amateur career
Clark was born in Leeds, England. He learned the game from his father, who was a scratch amateur. He won the 1971 Boys Amateur Championship and played for Great Britain & Ireland in the 1973 Walker Cup.

Professional career
Clark turned professional in 1973 and joined the European Tour in 1974. His first professional tournament win came in the 1975 Greater Manchester Open. In 1976 he won the T.P.D. Under-25 Championship and his first win on the European Tour was two years later at the 1978 Portuguese Open. Clark's final tally of European Tour wins was eleven, including pairs of wins in four consecutive seasons from 1984 to 1987. He also won the individual title at the World Cup of Golf in 1985. His best placing on the Order of Merit was third, which he achieved in both 1984 and 1986. His form fell away in the early 1990s but revived for a time in the middle of that decade, and he made the top twenty on the Order of Merit in 1994 and 1995. His last season on the tour was 1999 and he subsequently worked as an on-course commentator for BBC Sport before moving to Sky Sports.

Clark played in the Ryder Cup six times and was on three winning European teams and also the 1989 team which tied the match and retained the Cup.

Amateur wins
1971 Boys Amateur Championship

Professional wins (14)

European Tour wins (11)

*Note: The 1984 Whyte & Mackay PGA Championship was shortened to 54 holes due to weather.

European Tour playoff record (1–1)

Other wins (3)
1975 Greater Manchester Open
1976 T.P.D. Under-25 Championship
1985 World Cup (individual title)

Results in major championships

CUT = missed the half-way cut
"T" indicates a tie for a place

Summary

Most consecutive cuts made – 4 (1987 Masters – 1989 Open Championship)
Longest streak of top-10s – 1

Team appearances
Amateur
Walker Cup (representing Great Britain & Ireland): 1973

Professional
Ryder Cup (representing Great Britain and Ireland/Europe): 1977, 1981, 1985 (winners), 1987 (winners), 1989, 1995 (winners)
Hennessy Cognac Cup (representing Great Britain and Ireland): 1978 (winners), (representing England) 1984 (winners)
World Cup (representing England): 1978, 1984, 1985 (individual winner), 1987
Dunhill Cup (representing England): 1985, 1986, 1987 (winners), 1989, 1990, 1994, 1995
Nissan Cup (representing Europe): 1985, 1986

See also
List of golfers with most European Tour wins

References

External links

English male golfers
European Tour golfers
Ryder Cup competitors for Europe
Sportspeople from Leeds
People from Knaresborough
1954 births
Living people